Anolis townsendi, Townsend's anole or Cocos Island anole, is a species of lizard in the family Dactyloidae. The species is endemic to Cocos Island in Costa Rica.

Ecology
A. townsendi is sometimes predated on by the Cocos cuckoo (Coccyzus ferrugineus), a bird and another endemic species of the island.

References

Anoles
Reptiles described in 1900
Endemic fauna of Costa Rica
Reptiles of Costa Rica
Taxa named by Leonhard Stejneger